Nuno Mendes or Nuño Menéndez (died February 1071)  was the last count of Portugal from the family of Vímara Peres. The son of Count Mendo Nunes (Menendo Núñez), his desires for greater autonomy for Portugal led him to face King Garcia II of Galicia. On 18 February 1071 he fought in the Battle of Pedroso, near the Monastery of São Martinho de Tibães, and his defeat and death led the winning Garcia II to call himself King of Galicia and Portugal. The County of Portugal was then subsumed into the crowns of Galicia and León until regranted by King Alfonso VI of León and Castile a quarter-century later.

A patron of the Monastery of Guimarães, he first appears in the curia regis of King Ferdinand I of León in 1059, and with the title of count for the first time in 1070 when he appears confirming a donation made by King Garcia II.  He married Goncina with whom he appears on 17 February 1071 making a donation to the Monastery of Santo Antonino de Barbudo of some properties in Luivão, not far from Cávado, confirming as Ego comes Nunus Menendiz et uxor mea comitissa domna Goncina ("I, Count Nuno Menéndez and my wife Countess dona Goncina"). He owned properties in Nogueira, Santa Tecla, Dadim, Cerqueda, Gualtar, and Barros, which were probably confiscated after his defeat and given later by King Alfonso VI of León to his son-in-law Sisnando. Although the battle of Pedroso has been mistakenly dated in January of that year, as mentioned in the Chronica Gothorum, this donation proves that the battle took place in February rather than in January.

With his wife Goncina, he had at least one daughter, Loba "Aurevelido" Nunes, who married Sisnando Davides, the parents of Elvira Sisnandes whose husband, Count Martim Moniz, son of Munio Fromarigues, succeeded Sisnando as the governor of the county. He could also have been the father of Count Gómez Núñez and his brother Count Fernando.

Notes

References

Bibliography 

 
 

 

Year of birth missing
1071 deaths
Counts of Portugal
County of Portugal
11th-century counts of Portugal (Asturias-León)